The blue-naped chlorophonia (Chlorophonia cyanea) is a colourful South American species of bird in the family Fringillidae; it was formerly placed in the Thraupidae. It is generally fairly common.

Description
A small, plump, mainly green bird. The underparts are yellow, and the mantle/lower nape, rump and eye-ring are blue. Some subspecies have a yellow frontlet. Females are duller than the males, with underparts more greenish-yellow and less blue to the mantle/lower nape.

Distribution and habitat
Its distribution is highly disjunct, with population associated with the Atlantic Forest in south-eastern Brazil, eastern Paraguay and north-eastern Argentina, the Andes from Bolivia in south to Venezuela in north, the Perijá and Santa Marta Mountains, the Venezuelan Coastal Range, and the Tepuis. All populations are associated with humid forest, but locally it also occurs in nearby gardens and parks (especially in the Atlantic Forest region). Most populations are found in subtropical highlands, but it occurs down to near sea level in the Atlantic Forest region.

References

blue-naped chlorophonia
Birds of the Atlantic Forest
Birds of the Northern Andes
Birds of Brazil
Birds of Venezuela
blue-naped chlorophonia
Taxonomy articles created by Polbot
Birds of the Tepuis